The TransAmerica Bicycle Trail was the first bicycle touring route to cross the U.S. It was developed and mapped by Adventure Cycling Association, and travels between Astoria, Oregon, and Yorktown, Virginia, along mostly rural, two-lane highways.

History 
The TransAmerica Bicycle Trail began as the route for Bikecentennial, a mass bicycle tour across the country to celebrate the U.S. Bicentennial in 1976. The route was developed and mapped in the years preceding the event by volunteers and staff members of the organization Bikecentennial, which changed its name to Adventure Cycling Association in 1993. Over 4,100 cyclists rode at least part of the route during Bikecentennial, with 2,000 riding the entirety of the TransAmerica Bicycle Trail. Most of the riders were in their 20s and had no experience with long-distance cycling. They traveled in groups of 10 to 12 with leaders trained by Bikecentennial. There were few helmets to be seen and the bikes were often discount-store quality. But the equipment scarcely mattered. This group of people set out to have the experience of a lifetime and for the most part they did, learning about America and about themselves in a profound way. 

Since 2014, the annual Trans Am Bike Race is held on the route.

Route 
The route can generally be ridden between May and September and requires about two and a half months, depending on the rider’s average daily mileage. The current route length is 4,228 miles (6804.3 km). The TransAmerica Bicycle Trail was originally mapped with the intention of riding eastbound, but many riders choose to ride westbound. The route goes through several national parks including: such as Yellowstone and Grand Teton; small cities like Missoula, MT, and Carbondale, IL; and historical sites, especially at the route’s end in Yorktown, VA, in the Historic Triangle.

Terrain 
Some stretches of the western portion of the route follow large river valleys and can be generally flat, but expect some climbing almost every day between Astoria, Oregon, and Pueblo, Colorado. The passes throughout the Rocky Mountains are generally long but not terribly steep. The descents from these passes are, of course, a blast. Most of Kansas is beautifully flat. Missouri through the Ozarks and eastern Kentucky through the Appalachians offers short, steep climbs. You might even have to walk up some hills. The Virginia portion of the route, surprisingly, has more total elevation gain than any other state. The route takes riders on mostly rural, two-lane highways to avoid traffic and big cities.

States 
The TransAmerica Bicycle Trail takes riders through the following states:

 Oregon
 Idaho
 Montana
 Wyoming
 Colorado
 Kansas
 Missouri
 Illinois
 Kentucky
 Virginia

See also 
 Adventure Cycling Route Network

References

Cycleways in the United States